David Mailer (18 August 1874 – 21 December 1937) was an Australian cricketer. He played five first-class cricket matches for Victoria between 1899 and 1903.

See also
 List of Victoria first-class cricketers

References

External links
 

1874 births
1937 deaths
Australian cricketers
Victoria cricketers
Cricketers from Melbourne